Aline Sax (born 1984, Antwerp, Belgium) is a Belgian author of children's and young adult literature.  Ms. Sax has a master's degree and has received her Phd in History from the University of Antwerp. Besides being an author she also translates novels from English and German to Dutch.


Biography
She has a PhD in history and currently works as an historian and novelist. She wrote her first book when she was fifteen, about two German child soldiers at the Normandy beaches in June 1944. All of her novels are historical novels, capturing a wide range of themes and historical periods.
Her books are written in Dutch, but have been translated into German, Danish, Swedish, French, Korean, Arabic and English. She has been nominated for and won several literary prizes.

The War Within These Walls was published in the US in October 2013. It is a heavily illustrated novel that dramatically captures the brutal reality of the Warsaw Ghetto during World War II. The story is about a young Jew's struggle to survive and his participation in the 1943 uprising. Kirkus Reviews called it an 'unrelenting, heart-rending insight into the hell that the Nazis created. Gripping, powerful, shattering'.

The book is illustrated by Caryl Strzelecki and translated by Laura Watkinson. It was mentioned as one of the best books of 2013 by Kirkus Reviews and Publishers Weekly and won the National Jewish Book Awards as well as the silver medal of the Sydney Taylor Book Award and the Batchelder Honor Award of the American Library Association.

References

External links

 

1984 births
Belgian children's writers
Belgian women children's writers
20th-century Belgian women writers
Flemish women writers
Writers from Antwerp
Living people
Date of birth missing (living people)